Colombia made its Paralympic Games début at the 1976 Summer Paralympics in Toronto, with competitors taking part in track and field, table tennis and wheelchair basketball. The country has participated in every subsequent edition of the Summer Paralympics, except 1984, but has never entered the Winter Paralympics. 

Colombians have won a total of forty seven medals at the Paralympic Games: six gold, fifteen silver and twenty six bronze. Pedro Mejía won the country's first medals when he took a gold and a bronze in swimming in 1980. His winning time of 1:27.88 in the final of the 100m breaststroke, D category, set a new world record. Colombia had to wait 28 years for its next two medals, which both came in the 2008 Games. Elkin Serna ran the men's marathon in 2:31:16 in the T12 category for athletes with severe visual disability, finishing less than a minute behind Chinese athlete Qi Shun's world record time of 2:30:32, and took silver. Moisés Fuentes won bronze in the men's 100m breaststroke in the SB4 category. 2020 Summer Paralympics represented the best performance by the Colombian committee in the history of the Summer Paralympics, with a total amount of 24 medals won.

Medals

Medals by Summer Games

Medals by Winter Games

Medals by Summer Sport

List of Medalists

See also
 Colombia at the Olympics
 Colombia at the Youth Olympics
 Colombia at the Pan American Games

References

External links